The 1994–95 London Broncos season was the fifteenth in the club's history. It was their first season under the name of the London Broncos, following on from the London Crusaders and Fulham RLFC names. They competed in the 1994–95 Second Division of the Rugby Football League. They also competed in the 1994–95 Challenge Cup and the 1994–95 League Cup. They finished the season in 4th place in the second tier of British professional rugby league.

Second Division

The teams finishing in the top 7 went on to form the new First Division with teams from the Championship. London Broncos were fast tracked into the Championship as they were to be part of the new Super League in 1996.

References

External links
Rugby League Project

London Broncos seasons
London Broncos season
1994 in rugby league by club
1994 in English rugby league
London Broncos season
1995 in rugby league by club
1995 in English rugby league